Patrick Ridremont (born 9 August 1967) is a Belgian comedian and actor. He was born in Kinshasa (formerly Léopoldville) in the Democratic Republic of the Congo.

Personal life 
Ridremont has three daughters with Arielle Harcq. He was married to actress Virginie Efira from 2002 to 2005.

Filmography

Actor 
 2001: Mauvais genres by François Girod
 2005: Comme sur des roulettes by Jean-Paul Lilienfeld
 2006: De si vieux amis (short film) by Michael Alalouf
 2007: Mamie (short film) by Michaël Alalouf
 2007: Deux sœurs (short film) by Emmanuel Jespers
 2010: Zéro zéro belge by Pascal Rocteur
 2010: A Cat in Paris by Alain Gagnol and Jean-Loup Felicioli (voice)
 2010: La Chance de ma vie by Nicolas Cuche
 2011: BXL/USA (TV movie) by Gaëtan Bevernaege
 2012: Dead Man Talking
 2014: Kontainer Kats
 2015: En immersion (TV series) by Philippe Haïm
 2015: Flic tout simplement by Yves Rénier
 2015: Phantom Boy by Alain Gagnol and Jean-Loup Felicioli (voice)
 2016: Radin! by Fred Cavayé
 2016: Emma (TV series) by Alfred Lot
 2017: La Forêt by Julius Berg
 2017: Unit 42
 2017: Parole contre parole by Didier Bivel
 2018: Les Rivières pourpres (TV series)
 2019: Rebelles by Allan Mauduit

Director 
 2012: Dead Man Talking
 2017: La Station (short film)

References

External links 
 

Belgian male actors
Belgian directors
1967 births
Living people